Brandon La Ron Hammond (born February 6, 1984) is a former child actor who appeared in several movie and television roles mainly during the 1990s. He appeared in the feature films Waiting to Exhale (1995), Mars Attacks! (1996) and Soul Food (1997). He won an NAACP Image Award for his work in the latter.

On television, Hammond recurred on Western series Dr. Quinn, Medicine Woman (1996−98) and sitcom The Gregory Hines Show (1997−98). He earned a Young Artist Award nomination after performing in Gregory Hines.

Hammond's latest performance was in the television film Our America (2002). In adulthood, Hammond is a filmmaker who writes and directs short films.

Early life
Hammond was born as Brandon La Ron Hammond on February 6, 1984 in Baton Rouge, Louisiana, the son of Alfreda Williams, who managed her son's acting career.

Career
He made his acting debut at the age of 6, appearing in commercials for Chevrolet and public service announcements. Hammond's first film role was in Menace II Society (1993) where he played the younger version of the main character Caine. He followed this up with roles in Strange Days and Waiting to Exhale, both released in 1995. Hammond appeared in the horror anthology Tales from the Hood (1995) as Walter, a young boy who is scared of his abusive stepfather. Hammond performed as Marcus Jr. in 1996 television film The Road to Galveston.

In 1996, Hammond appeared in three feature films. Hammond portrayed Sean Rayburn in The Fan, the son of Wesley Snipes' character who is kidnapped by Gil (Robert DeNiro). He played Neville Williams in Tim Burton's Mars Attacks! and was a young Michael Jordan in Space Jam.

Hammond portrayed the character of Ahmad in Soul Food (1997). His performance in this film was well received, with critics describing Hammond as the film's standout actor, a natural and having talent that "far surpasses his age." He was awarded the NAACP Image Award in 1998 for Outstanding Youth Actor as Ahmad.

He had a recurring role on the television series Dr. Quinn, Medicine Woman during its final two seasons, playing the character of Anthony, an adopted son of Grace and Robert E. Hammond continued playing the role until Anthony was killed off. Hammond was Hines' son, Matty Stevenson, in short-lived sitcom The Gregory Hines Show (1997−98). A reviewer for The New York Times opined Hines and Hammond had good chemistry. In 1998, Hammond received two nominations for an Young Artist Award and YoungStar Award in recognition of his acting on Gregory Hines.

Hammond guest starred on various series during the 1990s and early 2000s, including Coach, Hangin' with Mr. Cooper, Dave's World, Early Edition and The West Wing. He appeared in crime drama Blue Hill Avenue (2001). Hammond's last role to date was Lloyd Newman in the 2002 Showtime film Our America. He received his third Young Artist Award nomination for acting in Our America.

Following the end of his acting career, Hammond attended Saddleback College, where he submitted a student film titled Summer Blame (2006). His film was nominated at the Newport Beach Film Festival. Hammond wrote the short film Amaru, which received the award for best screenwriting at the John Singleton Short Film Competition in 2020.

Filmography

Film
 1993 Menace II Society
 1995 Tales from the Hood
 1995 Strange Days
 1995 Waiting to Exhale
 1996 No Easy Way
 1996 The Fan
 1996 Space Jam
 1996 Mars Attacks!
 1997 Soul Food
 2001 Blue Hill Avenue

Television
 1993 Lies and Lullabies (TV Movie)
 1994 Coach episode: "Blue Chip Blues"
 1996–1998 Dr. Quinn, Medicine Woman
 1997–1998 The Gregory Hines Show
 1998 Penn & Teller's Sin City Spectacular episode
 1998 Early Edition episode: 'Hot Day In The Old Town"
 2000 The West Wing episode "The White House Pro-Am"
 2002 Our America (TV movie)

Home video
 1994 Mickey's Fun Songs: Campout at Walt Disney World

Awards and nominations

References

External links
 

Place of birth missing (living people)
African-American male actors
Living people
American male child actors
American male film actors
American male television actors
21st-century African-American people
1984 births